Olaf Förster (born 2 November 1962) is a retired German rower who had his best achievements in the coxless fours. In this event, he won a gold medal at the 1988 Summer Olympics and world titles in 1987 and 1989.

Förster's wife Kerstin also won a gold medal in rowing at the 1988 Olympics. The couple has two children.

References

1962 births
Living people
Sportspeople from Chemnitz
People from Bezirk Karl-Marx-Stadt
East German male rowers
Rowers at the 1988 Summer Olympics
Olympic rowers of East Germany
Olympic gold medalists for East Germany
Olympic medalists in rowing
Medalists at the 1988 Summer Olympics
World Rowing Championships medalists for East Germany
Recipients of the Patriotic Order of Merit in gold